is a Japanese actor, singer, and model who was last affiliated with Oscar Promotion.  He played the role of Tokacchi (ToQ 2gou) in the 2014 38th entry Super Sentai TV series Ressha Sentai ToQger.

In 2007, with Hidemasa Shiozawa and Koki Kato, they joined to the twin vocal unit Sprout. He was in charge as the keyboard vocal in the group. In August of the same year, the group disbanded.

Biography
At the age of three, Hiramaki started learning the electric organ, and began to play it when he was eight. From 2010-2012, Hiramaki appeared as Shuichiro Oishi in the Musical Prince of Tennis Second Season. Until he graduated along with 6th generation Seigaku cast (with the exemption of Ryoma Echizen's actor, Ogoe Yuuki, who continued his role along with the new cast) at Seigaku Farewell Party in 2012. In 2014, he appeared in Ressha Sentai ToQger as Tokacchi/ToQ 2gou. Like his role, actors Ryouma Baba from Tokumei Sentai Go-Busters and Yamato Kinjo from Zyuden Sentai Kyoryuger all are the oldest of the cast and Sentai blue rangers born from the Shōwa era.

Filmography

TV series

Films

Theatre

References

External links
 Official profile at Oscar Promotion 
 

Japanese male actors
Japanese male models
1987 births
Living people
Singers from Tokyo
21st-century Japanese singers
21st-century Japanese male singers